Radical 50 or radical turban meaning "turban" or "scarf" is one of the 31 Kangxi radicals (214 radicals total) composed of three strokes.

In the Kangxi Dictionary, there are 295 characters (out of 49,030) to be found under this radical.

 is also the 40th indexing component in the Table of Indexing Chinese Character Components predominantly adopted by Simplified Chinese dictionaries published in mainland China.

Evolution

Derived characters

Literature

External links

Unihan Database - U+5DFE

050
040